Chakravakam may refer to:
 A kind of bird called ruddy goose or Brahmany duck
 Chakravakam (raga), a raga (musical scale) of South Indian classical music
 Chakravakam (1974 Telugu film), a 1974 Indian Telugu-language film based on the novel Chakravakam by Koduri Kausalya Devi
 Chakravakam (1974 Malayalam film), a 1974 Indian Malayalam-language film directed by Thoppil Bhasi
 Chakravakam (TV series), an India Telugu-language soap opera